The Spotify Global 200 is a chart that ranks the most-streamed songs in the world on the music streaming platform Spotify. Their data is based on the streams each song gets within a 24-hour period ending 04:00 (UTC) each day. In 2023, two songs claimed the top spot in seven weeks of Spotify Charts.

In 2023, American singers SZA, Miley Cyrus, Karol G and Shakira have been the artists to lead the chart so far. However, achieved their first global number-one song.

Miley Cyrus's song "Flowers" was the longest-running song of the year, having topped the chart for eight non-consecutive weeks in 2023. SZA's "Kill Bill" stayed at number one for two consecutive weeks, while Karol G and Shakira's "TQG" topped the chart for one week.

Chart history

Number-one artists

See also 

 2023 in American music
 List of Billboard Hot 100 number ones of 2023
 List of most-streamed songs on Spotify

References 

Spotify
2023 record charts
2023 in American music